The Oregon Canyon Mountains are a mountain range in Malheur County, Oregon, east of the Trout Creek Mountains.

References 

Mountain ranges of Oregon
Mountain ranges of Malheur County, Oregon